ADB-4en-PINACA is a cannabinoid designer drug that has been found as an ingredient in some synthetic cannabis products, first appearing in early 2021. It is a reasonably potent cannabinoid agonist in vitro but has not been so widely sold as related compounds such as ADB-PINACA and MDMB-4en-PINACA.

See also 
 5F-ADB-PINACA
 ADB-BINACA
 ADB-CHMINACA
 ADB-FUBINACA
 ADB-HEXINACA

References 

Cannabinoids
Designer drugs

Indazolecarboxamides
Tert-butyl compounds